Kummer is a German surname. Notable people with the surname include:

Bernhard Kummer (1897–1962), German Germanist
Clare Kummer (1873—1958), American composer, lyricist and playwright
Clarence Kummer (1899–1930), American jockey 
Christopher Kummer (born 1975), German economist
Corby Kummer (born 1957), American journalist 
Dirk Kummer (born 1966), German actor, director, and screenwriter
Eberhard Kummer (1940–2019), Austrian concert singer, lawyer, and medieval music expert
Eduard Kummer, also known as the following Ernst Kummer
Eloise Kummer (1916–2008), American actress
Ernst Kummer (1810–1893), German mathematician
Kummer configuration, a mathematical structure discovered by Ernst Kummer
Kummer surface, a related geometrical structure discovered by Ernst Kummer
Ferdinand von Kummer (1816-1900), German general
Frederic Arnold Kummer (1873–1943), American author, playwright, and screenwriter
Friedrich August Kummer (1797–1879), German cellist and composer
Karl Kummer (disambiguation), more than one person
Kaspar Kummer, (1795–1870), German flautist and composer
Lilian Kummer (born 1975), Swiss skier
Luise Kummer (born 1993), German biathlete
Mario Kummer (born 1962), German cyclist
Nicolas Kummer (1882–1954), Luxembourgian gymnast
Paul Kummer (1834–1912), priest, taxonomist of Zerbst
Patrizia Kummer (born 1987), Swiss snowboarder
Siegfried Adolf Kummer (1899–1977), German mystic and Germanic revivalist
Sigrud Kummer, (born ? ), German sprint canoeist
Thomas Kummer (born 1963), American classicist and teacher
Thomas John Kummer (1933–1969), American celebrity hair stylist known professionally as Jay Sebring
Tom Kummer (born 1963), Swiss journalist
Wolfgang Kummer (disambiguation), more than one person

See also
Cummer (disambiguation)
Kommer

German-language surnames
Surnames from nicknames